Clinura vitrea is a species of sea snail, a marine gastropod mollusk in the family Raphitomidae.

Description
The length of the shell attains 21.3 mm, its diameter 10.5 mm.

Distribution
This marine species occurs off the Tanimbar Islands, eastern Indonesia and in the Banda Sea at depths between 417 m and 425 m.

References

 *

External links
 
 MNHN, Paris: holotype

vitrea
Gastropods described in 1997